The 2013 North Las Vegas mayoral election was held on April 2, 2013, to elect the mayor of North Las Vegas, Nevada. It saw the election of John Jay Lee, who defeated incumbent mayor Shari Buck.

Results

References 

North Las Vegas
Mayoral elections in North Las Vegas, Nevada
North Las Vegas